Sigma Lambda Upsilon or Señoritas Latinas Unidas Sorority, Inc. is a Latina-based sorority founded on December 1, 1987 at Binghamton University. The organization was created to promote academic achievement and serve the Latino community and the campuses that Sigma Lambda Upsilon serves. The sorority is now present in over 50 campuses. Though Latina-based, Sigma Lambda Upsilon Sorority, Inc. is a non-discriminatory organization.

History

Origins
The sorority (like other Greek members within the National Association of Latino Fraternal Organizations) was founded during the post-1975 phase of the Latino Greek Movement which followed the "principio" (principle) stage initially kickstarted in 1898 by student activism on college campuses. The "fuerza" (force) wave of Greek-lettered Latino organizations in the 1980s would then begin as the result of many Latino students feeling they had to create a more favorable system of American higher education for Latino population witin the country. This would be a much talked about issue during the time for social justice activists within the community as a result of the stagnant growth of Latino student enrollment during the 1980s through the early 1990s.

Establishment
The initial steps for the creation of Sigma Lambda Upsilon, Señoritas Latinas Unidas Sorority, Incorporated were taken in 1986 at Binghamton University. In this period of time, fellow NALFO Latino fraternal organization La Unidad Latina, Lambda Upsilon Lambda, Fraternity, Incorporated was considering being co-ed as the founding line of its Beta chapter included two women by the names of Carol Lasso and Vanina Gonzalez. Eventually, however, the decision was made amongst its members to keep Lambda Upsilon Lambda from that moment on, exclusive, to those who identified as male. The result of this decision would lead to the fraternity's Beta chapter coming up with its two female members, the concept of a sorority on-campus that would be able to unite the community's Latina women. Shortly afterward in December 1987, the founding line of the organization would be formed, with four women: Cynthia Santiago, Adriana Zamora, Carmen Ibeth Garcia-Quiñones, and Carol Elizabeth Torres, creating the Alpha chapter of Sigma Lambda Upsilon at the university, forming the first Latina-interest sorority on campus with their titles of "founding mothers".

Philanthropy
Historically, the organization has worked with children and youth as the primary target population to aid in literacy in education and career success. In the early 1990s, there was much interest centered on bilingualism in the classroom and the high illiteracy rates across America. At age four, Latino children tend to have less developed school-related skills than their caucasian counterparts. By age nine, It was found that Latino students tend to lag behind in reading, mathematics, and science proficiency. Thus, in the spring of 2000, the Sorority decided to focus its efforts and funding on literacy. The Sorority advocates for literacy as a means of ensuring the empowerment and success of our nation and the people of its diverse communities. They encourage literacy as an activity that affords limitless possibilities and promotes reading and writing as enjoyable, exciting, and empowering.

Literacy is more than just reading. It’s the ability to identify, understand, interpret, create, communicate, computer and use printed and written materials associated with varying contexts. Literacy can be expanded to include many areas such as: financial literacy, technological literacy, health literacy and more. The premise of their philanthropic work focuses on the power of literacy to uplift their communities and foster confidence in their young people, for them to advance toward their educational, personal, and professional goals.

Symbolism 
The sorority heavily uses Pre-Colombian imagery to represent its goals.

Mentoring programs

Sigma Lambda Upsilon's national mentoring initiatives are the Leadership, Advancement, and Development of our Young Sisters (LADYS) and Promoting Education, the Arts, our Roots, Leadership and Service (PEARLS) programs.

Awards and recognition

Sigma Lambda Upsilon Sorority, Inc. has been recognized by the National Association of Latino Fraternal Organizations (NALFO) for the Sorority’s outstanding commitment to academic and professional excellence, as well as, continuous philanthropic efforts.

Chapters

Undergraduate chapters
Sigma Lambda Upsilon/Señoritas Latinas Unidas Sorority, Inc. has installed 43 chapters at over 60 Colleges and Universities, including:

Alpha chapter - Binghamton University
Beta chapter - Buffalo State College, University at Buffalo, Daemen College
Gamma chapter - University of Pennsylvania, Temple University, Bryn Mawr College, Drexel University, St. Joseph’s University
Delta chapter - Brown University
Epsilon chapter - State University of New York at Cortland
Zeta chapter - State University of New York at Oswego
Eta chapter - Syracuse University
Iota chapter - Cornell University, Ithaca College
Kappa chapter - Princeton University
Lambda chapter - Rutgers, The State University of New Jersey
Mu chapter - University at Albany, Rensselaer Polytechnic Institute, Union College, College of Saint Rose
Nu chapter - Pennsylvania State University
Xi chapter - University of Rhode Island
Omicron chapter - New York University, City College-CUNY, Baruch College-CUNY, St. Francis College, Lehman College-CUNY
Pi chapter - Yale University
Rho chapter - Johnson and Wales University
Sigma chapter - Union College
Tau chapter - Rutgers University-Newark
Upsilon chapter - University of Maryland, College Park
Phi chapter - University of Massachusetts-Amherst, Smith College, Hampshire College, Amherst College, Mount Holyoke College
Chi chapter - Boston University, Tufts University, Brandeis University, Massachusetts Institute of Technology
Psi chapter - University of Rochester, Rochester Institute of Technology, St. John Fisher College, Nazareth College
Omega chapter - Old Dominion University
Alpha Alpha chapter - Columbia University, Barnard College
Alpha Beta chapter - Dartmouth College
Alpha Gamma chapter - George Washington University
Alpha Delta chapter - State University of New York at Stony Brook
Alpha Epsilon chapter - State University of New York at Plattsburgh
Alpha Zeta chapter - Virginia Commonwealth University
Alpha Eta chapter - Indiana University at Bloomington
Alpha Theta chapter - Wesleyan University
Alpha Iota chapter - Hamilton College
Alpha Kappa chapter - Adelphi University
Alpha Lambda chapter - Montclair State University
Alpha Mu chapter - State University of New York at New Paltz
Alpha Nu chapter - Grand Valley State University
Alpha Xi chapter - Pace University-Pleasantville
Alpha Omicron chapter - University of Connecticut-Storrs
Alpha Pi chapter - Georgia State University
Alpha Rho chapter - University of Virginia-Charlottesville
Alpha Sigma chapter - Farmingdale State College
Alpha Tau chapter - James Madison University
Alpha Upsilon - Indiana University-Purdue University Indianapolis
Alpha Phi - Kennesaw State University
Alpha Chi - University of Georgia

Graduate chapters
Graduate chapters, open to alumnae as well as alumnae initiates, include:
Theta Alpha - New York City, NY
Theta Beta - Providence, RI
Theta Gamma - Albany, NY
Theta Delta - Texas
Theta Epsilon - Buffalo, NY
Theta Zeta - Philadelphia, PA
Theta Eta - New Jersey
Theta Theta - DC/Maryland/Northern Virginia
Theta Iota - Florida
Theta Kappa - California
Theta Lambda - Harrisburg, PA
Theta Mu - Boston, MA
Theta Nu - OH / MI / IN / IL
Theta Xi - Rochester, NY
Theta Omicron - Westchester, NY
Theta Pi - Atlanta, GA
Theta Rho - Long Island, NY
Theta Sigma - Southern VA

References

National website
NALFO

External links
National website

1987 establishments in New York (state)
Student societies in the United States
Latino fraternities and sororities
Student organizations established in 1987
National Association of Latino Fraternal Organizations